The Solidarity Party of Afghanistan (Hezeb-e Hembestegi-ye Afqanustan; abbr. SPA) is a minor political party in Afghanistan. The party platform focuses on four main issues: secularism, women's rights, democracy, and opposition to NATO's Resolute Support Mission in Afghanistan. The party is strongly critical of the Afghan government, which it views as corrupt, fundamentalist, and dominated by warlords. The party claims a membership of some 30,000.

History
The party boycotted the 2005 and 2010 parliamentary elections.

The party was suspended in June 2012 following a Kabul demonstration in late April 2012 where the party accused a number of Afghan leaders, including former leaders and commanders, of committing war crimes over the last three decades of conflict, and demanded they be brought to justice.

The SPA boycotted the 2004, 2009, and 2014 Afghan Presidential elections as the party alleges that an individual cannot be elected without the approval of the US government. The party does, however, take part in provincial elections as it believes these elections to be more democratic and harder for central government to control or rig. No SPA members ran in the 2013 provincial elections, although the party did support certain candidates. The party condemned the 2019 Turkish offensive into north-eastern Syria.

See also
List of political parties in Afghanistan
Revolutionary Association of the Women of Afghanistan

References

External links

2004 establishments in Afghanistan
Afghan nationalism
Anti-imperialism in Asia
Anti-imperialist organizations
Democratic socialist parties in Asia
Feminist organisations in Afghanistan
Feminist parties in Asia
Left-wing nationalist parties
Nationalist parties in Afghanistan
Political parties established in 2004
Political parties in Afghanistan
Progressive International
Progressive parties
Secularism in Afghanistan
Secularist organizations
Social democratic parties in Asia
Socialist parties in Afghanistan
Women's rights in Afghanistan
Women's rights organizations